The 2012 Copa del Rey de Balonmano was the 37th edition of the Copa del Rey de Balonmano. It took place in the Palacio de los Deportes Infanta Cristina, in Torrevieja, Valencian Community, between 7 & 11 March 2012. It was hosted by Liga ASOBAL, Torrevieja city council, Costa Blanca Tourism & Hotel La Laguna. Torrevieja was the host team. Torrevieja hosted Copa del Rey for second time from 2002.

Qualified teams
The qualified teams were the top seven teams on standings at midseason, besides the host team.

Venue

Matches

Quarter-finals

Semifinals

Final

See also
Liga ASOBAL 2011–12
División de Plata de Balonmano 2011–12

References

External links
Official website
Official guide

2011–12
Copa